Solaris Urbino 10 is a series of low-floor buses from the Solaris Urbino series, designed for transport, produced since 2002 by the Polish company Solaris Bus & Coach in Bolechowo near Poznań. Being produced in the Urbino third-generation models, but this is the second generation Urbino 10.

History
The Neoplan Polska company had created a family of buses under the new brand name Solaris and started from the models with lengths of 9, 12, 15 and 18 meters. After an announcement by one of the cities in the tender for larger number of buses with lengths of 10 metres, Solaris Bus & Coach developed a new model with this length, initially offered under the brand Solaris Urbinetto 10. At the same time they abandoned the production of the shortest model Solaris Urbino 9.

Since the spring of 2005 the company has produced Solaris Urbino 10 in their third generation, but this is the second version of this bus. It is produced in versions with diesel engines (initially meeting emission standards of Euro 3 and Euro 4, Euro 5 or EEV), and since 2005 can be manufactured with a variety of gas-powered CNG engines by companies like Iveco and MAN. The basic engine used in this bus model is the Cummins ISB6.7E5 250B with a maximum power 180.5 kW (245 hp), meeting the requirements of the Euro 5 standard, with an option of stronger Cummins ISB6.7E5 285B unit with maximum power of 209 kW (284 hp). All axles come from ZF. The front axle is ZF RL 75 EC or optional ZF RL 85 A, rear axle ZF AV 132 is fitted as standard with a gearbox retarder. The chassis has a central lubrication system. The bus has the construction made from corrosion-resistant steel. Similarly the panels are from aluminium. The electrical system is based on the CAN bus system.

Solaris Urbino 10 in Europe

References

Solaris Bus & Coach
Low-floor buses
Midibuses
Hybrid electric buses
Buses of Poland
Vehicles introduced in 2002